Perla Parthasarathy Reddy is a Telugu Desam Party politician from Vemula (village & mondal) in Kadapa district in Andhra Pradesh.

An advocate by profession, he was Pulivendula market committee chairman when convicted in the murder case of Y. S. Raja Reddy. Now he wants to contest for pulivendula MLA seat in the next 2019 elections.

References

Telugu Desam Party politicians
1949 births
People from Kadapa district
Living people